William Hope (born 2 June 1993) is an Irish professional rugby league footballer who plays as a second row or  for the Swinton Lions in the Championship and Ireland at international level.

In 2014, he was called up to the Ireland squad and has been ever present in the team. In 2016, he was called up to the Ireland squad for the 2017 Rugby League World Cup European Pool B qualifiers.

Hope has previously played for the Salford City Reds. He has also spent time on loan at the Sheffield Eagles and Oldham (Heritage № 1314). He joined Oldham in 2015 and was released at the end of the 2016 season. He then signed for Sheffield in January 2017.

Hope was selected to travel with the Ireland squad for the 2017 World Cup, he only made one appearance but scored twice against Wales.

References

External links
(archived by web.archive.org) Sheffield Eagles profile
(archived by web.archive.org) Oldham R.L.F.C. profile
(archived by web.archive.org) Statistics at rlwc2017.com

1993 births
Living people
Ireland national rugby league team players
Irish rugby league players
Oldham R.L.F.C. players
Rugby league second-rows
Salford Red Devils players
Sheffield Eagles players
Swinton Lions captains
Swinton Lions players